Ulvsunda Castle (Ulfsunda slott)  is an manor house at Bromma in  Stockholm, Sweden.

History
The building was built in 1644–1647 by Field Marshal Lennart Torstenson (1603–1651). The current appearance of the building dates from the 1830s. The baronial family   Åkerhielm family came to own Ulvsunda in the years 1843–1902. Prime Minister Gustaf Åkerhielm (1833–1900) used the  estate principally as a summer residence.  His heirs sold most of the property in 1902. In 1904, the city of Stockholm bought the property.  Ulvsunda is today a hotel and conference facility.

See also
List of castles in Sweden

References

External links
   Ulfsunda slott website

Buildings and structures in Stockholm
Castles in Stockholm County